Ármin Jamak (born 19 February 1993) is a Hungarian indie musician, best known as the lead singer of the Hungarian indie band Carbovaris.

Early life and personal life
Jamak was born in Budapest, Hungary. He attended ELTE Apáczai János Csere secondary school in Budapest.

Carbovaris

Jamak is the founding member of Carbovaris.

Jamak was interviewed by Recorder on 10 July 2013. He said that he usually spends his freetime at the Balaton Lake and once he saw a concert of Anna and the Barbies. Jamak was also asked to join the band and sing a song with them.

In an interview with Radiopro, Jamak said that they shot the video clip for their song Sand and Dust on the Szentendre Island. In the video clip the band members are holding mirrors in which different landscapes can be seen.

Discography
With Carbovaris:
Albums
 Milos (2011)
 A Very Milos Holiday (2013)

See also
Budapest indie music scene
Carbovaris

References

External links
 Jamak on Zeneszöveg.hu

1993 births
Living people
Hungarian indie rock musicians
Musicians from Budapest